Nocturnal Masquerade is the debut studio album by American metalcore band Toothgrinder. The album was released on January 29, 2016, through Spinefarm Records. This is the last release to feature guitarist Matt Mielke.

Overview
The album was produced by Taylor Larson (Darkest Hour, Veil of Maya). Spencer Sotelo of Periphery provides guest vocals on the song "Diamonds for Gold."

Five music videos were released from the album: "The House (That Fear Built)" on November 3, 2015; "Lace & Anchor" on November 25; "Diamonds for Gold" on January 18, 2016; "Blue" on April 20; and "Coeur D'Alene" on June 22.

The songs "The Hour Angle," "Dejection / Despondency," and "Schizophrenic Jubilee" were re-recorded from the EP Schizophrenic Jubilee.

Track listing

Personnel
Toothgrinder
 Justin Matthews – lead vocals
 Jason Goss – rhythm guitar
 Matt Mielke – lead guitar
 Matt Arensdorf – bass, backing vocals
 Wills Weller – drums

Additional personnel
 Spencer Sotelo – additional vocals on track 8, additional engineering 
 Taylor Larson – production, engineering, mixing
 Paul Leavitt – mastering

References

2016 albums
Toothgrinder albums
Spinefarm Records albums